The 1574  was the first time Itami Castle would be attacked.

History 
Oda Nobunaga forces under Araki Murashige besieged the castle, in the mean time during the siege Hashiba Hideyoshi attacked the castle by digging a long tunnel from outside the walls to a spot near to the castle's keep. 
Later, after the castle fell, Nobunaga give the castle to Araki Murashige. 
Murashige expanded the castle, and it became one of the biggest castles in this region. 

Later, after Araki Murashige Rebellion, this castle capture by Oda Nobunaga again at the Siege of Itami (1579), this castle was abolished by Ikeda Motosuke, a major general under Nobunaga.

See also
Siege of Itami (1579)

References

Itami 1574
1574 in Japan
Conflicts in 1574
Itami 1574